Yuzawa, Akita held a mayoral election on April 17, 2005 after the merger of two cities and a village. Suzuki Toshio won the election.

Candidates 

 Endou Kouji
 Nisaka Nobukuni
 Suga Yoshio
 Suzuki Toshio, former mayor and supported by the Japanese Communist Party.

Results

References 
 Results from JanJan 
 Japan Press Coverage

Yuzawa, Akita
2005 elections in Japan
Mayoral elections in Japan
April 2005 events in Japan